The 1928 municipal election was held on December 3, 1928. Charles Bibby was acclaimed the Mayor of the City of Sudbury.

The candidates elected to Sudbury City Council were:
 Peter Fenton
 Leo J. Robert
 Philippe Lanthier
 J. Newburn
 Dan Jessup
 F. C. Muirhead

At the time of this election, the candidates were elected to serve the City of Sudbury and were not elected to represent each of the wards individually.

Election moments
The election results were not fully tabulated until 12 o’clock the day after the election.  
During the election, there was a minor mix-up in the returns.  Councillor Drybrough’s total was given at 751 when in reality it was 731.  The town clerk, W. J. Ross, who was responsible of for returns, was questioned by the Sudbury Star regarding this discrepancy.

The reporter requested that Mr. Ross to look at his list.  Mr. Ross tersely said that he wouldn’t.  
“But how do you account for the difference of twenty?” enquired the reporter.
“Seven men checked those figures” replied the town clerk with all the dignity of his command.  “and  they’re official. I won’t change them.”

Initially Ross wouldn’t change the figures; however, after the reporter removed the results card from the wall, he continued to press Ross for answer.  Ross then quickly reviewed the figures and subsequently Frank C. Muirhead was elected to council, defeating the incumbent Drybourogh by 20 votes.

The reporter continued to investigate the election results, and also discovered that Council;or Newburn also had 20 votes misallocated.  Newburn's tally in the "L – Z" poll was 139 when it should have read 159.  Concerned that Newburn would not have the necessary clout in the Fournier ward after the election, the reporter brought this to the attention of the officials.  The reporter subsequently stopped investigating, after an unnamed candidate elect cautioned him against further investigation.  He was quoted as saying "First thing you know, if you keep checking these figures I'll find out I haven't been elected at all."

Results

The results of the mayoral and Aldermanic contests as reported by the Sudbury Star on December 5, 1928 are as follows:

References

1928
1928 elections in Canada
1928 in Ontario